Postpositive may mean:
in philosophy, related to postpositivism, a development of positivism
in grammar, following a related word or phrase, as with a postpositive adjective

See also

Postpositivism (international relations)
Preposition and postposition